Aranmula Puncha is the vast Paddy fields in Aranmula with an area of approximately 5.36 km2.

As part of Haritha Keralam programme, Government of Kerala launched cultivation in Aranmula Puncha in November 2016.

In February 2017, Government conducted a Harvest festival and launched Aranmula Rice brand at the function.

References

Aranmula